Will Wood is an American singer-songwriter, composer, filmmaker, comedian, and multimedia artist.

Wood has released four studio albums: Everything Is A Lot in 2015; SELF-iSH in 2016, The Normal Album in 2020, and "In case I make It," in 2022. Wood has also composed music for the podcast Camp Here and There, and is co-host of the comedy podcast Life in the World to Come with creator Chris Dunne.

Style 
Wood's piano-led style often changes from one song to the next, drawing influence from folk, pop, jazz, rock and roll, latin music, and klezmer. He is also known for his unconventional use of tenor and baritone ukulele. When recording in studio or performing live with a band, he has mostly been accompanied by "The Tapeworms", which has primarily included Mike Bottiglieri on guitar, Matt Berger on alto saxophone, Mario Conte on drums, and Vater Boris on bass. The band is known for high energy live performances. Wood primarily performs solo, his shows featuring a combination of music, monologue, and stand-up comedy.

Personal life 
Wood has been described as "reclusive", and is known to avoid social media. Little is known about his personal life, and sources about Wood contain conflicting accounts of even basic information about his personal and professional life. He is also known for early in his career having fictionalized his life and appearing in character in some press appearances or onstage, and engaging in experimental live performance art, with his acts featuring simulated mental breakdowns, conflict with audience plants, appearances from fictional characters, and intentionally botched performances.

Wood has consistently been open about his past struggles with addiction and mental illness, having entered recovery early in his career and later being diagnosed with Bipolar Disorder. Wood donates portions of his income to various mental health charities, including the Brain and Behavior Research Foundation, saying, "I’ve gotten a lot better. I want to try and do something to help others get there."

Releases
Wood began releasing music with his band "The Tapeworms" in 2015. Under the moniker “Will Wood and the Tapeworms,” he had released two studio albums: Everything is a Lot in 2015, SELF-iSH in 2016, and the live album The Real Will Wood in 2018, which later served as the soundtrack to the mockumentary concert film of the same name.

In 2019, a crowdfunding campaign began for The Normal Album, which raised $27,631 and was released in 2020 under his own name.

His newest studio album, titled "In case I make It," was crowdfunded on Indiegogo in October 2021. Wood has described the collection of songs as being his most personal yet, saying: “I've always tried to consistently re-invent myself as an artist, I think. But this time is different, because for lack of a less dramatic phrase… I've reinvented myself as a person. I couldn’t be more different than I was even a year or two ago."

Six singles from "In case I make It," were released prior to the album's full release. In September 2021, prior to the crowdfunding of the album, Wood released a single entitled "Sex, Drugs, Rock 'n' Roll" (also featured on the album). On June 10, Wood released the single You Liked This (Okay, Computer!), a spoken word black comedy track about social media platforms. It stars voice actress Bev Standing, whose voice was allegedly used by video sharing social media platform TikTok for their text-to-speech feature without her consent. On July 27, the full album was released to positive reviews.

In 2022, Wood released a single entitled "Ferryman" with singer-songwriter Shayfer James.

On January 13, 2023, Wood released the album IN CASE I DIE, a live compilation of songs recorded at US tour dates in 2022. According to a guest blog post on V13, after the release he would begin an "indefinite break or possibly retire from [his] music career."

Discography
Full-length albums
Everything is a Lot (as Will Wood and the Tapeworms) (2015/05/20) (Remastered : 2020/12/25)
SELF-iSH (as Will Wood and the Tapeworms) (2016/08/23) (Remastered : 2020/12/25)
The Real Will Wood (Music from the Award-Winning Concert Film) (as Will Wood and the Tapeworms) (2020/02/07)
The Normal Album (2020/07/10)
"In case I make it," (2022/07/29)
IN CASE I DIE (2023/01/13)

Soundtracks
The Real Will Wood (Music from the Award-Winning Concert Film) (as Will Wood and the Tapeworms) (2020/02/07)
Camp Here & There (Original Series Soundtrack) (2021/05/08)
Camp Here & There Soundtrack: Campfire Songs Edition (2022/04/08)

Singles
"Alma Mater" (2020/05/10)
"Love, Me Normally" (2020/05/29) (From The Normal Album)
"Laplace's Angel (Hurt People? Hurt People!)" (2020/06/12) (From The Normal Album)
"...Well, Better Than the Alternative" (2020/06/26) (From The Normal Album)
"Mr. Fregoli and the Diathesis-Stress Supermodel, Or: How I Learned to Stop Worrying and Love the Con (An Untitled Track)" (as Will Wood and the Tapeworms) (2020/07/10)
"Sex, Drugs, Rock 'n' Roll" (2021/09/20) (From "In case I make it,")
"Your Body, My Temple" (2022/01/19) (From "Camp Here & There Soundtrack: Campfire Songs Edition")
"Tomcat Disposables" (2022/04/29) (From "In case I make it,")
"Cicada Days" (2022/05/27) (From "In case I make it,")
"You Liked This (Okay Computer!)" (2022/06/10) (From "In case I make it,")
"Euthanasia" (2022/06/17) (From "In case I make it,")
"White Noise" (2022/07/07) (From "In case I make it,")
"Ferryman" (2022/08/19) (With Shayfer James)
"Cicada Days - Knitting Factory, Spokane, WA" (2022/12/16) (From "IN CASE I DIE (Live)")

References

American male pianists
American male singer-songwriters
Living people
Year of birth missing (living people)
Artists from New Jersey
Musicians from New Jersey